Tia Bajpai (born Twinkle Bajpai) is an Indian singer, television and film actress. She made her film debut in 2011 with Vikram Bhatt's film Haunted - 3D, and appeared in 1920: Evil Returns and Baankey Ki Crazy Baraat. She also participated in Sa Re Ga Ma Pa Challenge 2005.

Career
 
hailing from Lucknow in Uttar Pradesh, Bajpai started her career by appearing in a few television serials and shows. She made her film and singing debut from Vikram Bhatt's horror thriller Haunted 3D in 2011, co-starring Mahaakshay Chakraborty, where she portrayed the character of Meera Sabharwal who is tortured by her piano teacher (played by Arif Zakaria). Taran Adarsh of Bollywood Hungama rated 3.5/5 to the film. 

In 2012, Bajpai appeared in Vikram Bhatt's next horror thriller 1920: The Evil Returns, sequel to the 2008 film 1920, alongside Aftab Shivdasani, She portrayed the role of Smriti, a girl who is possessed by an evil spirit. The film garnered average reviews from critics, but turned out to be commercially successful. 
In 2020, Bajpai released her first international solo album "Upgrade". The music videos for the album were released on YouTube. The song called "Bon Appetit" from the album was released on 23 May and features India's first 3D animation video and has received more than a million views on YouTube. She was credited as Tia B on her album.

Television appearances

Filmography

As Singer

Accolades

References

External links

 
 
 

Living people
Indian women playback singers
Sa Re Ga Ma Pa participants
Indian film actresses
Actresses in Hindi cinema
21st-century Indian actresses
21st-century Indian singers
21st-century Indian women singers
Singers from Lucknow
Women musicians from Uttar Pradesh
Year of birth missing (living people)